The Ministry of Mining of the Republic of Kenya is a Kenyan government ministry that oversees the Mineral sector in the country.

The Ministry was established as an independent ministry after the 2013 general elections. The government realized that the mining industry had the potential to spur the countries economic growth. Previous to its establishment all mining related activities in Kenya were overseen by the Ministry of Environment and Natural Resources.

Hon. Najib Balala a jubilee government principle was appointed as the first Cabinet Secretary to run the newly formed ministry.

History
The ministry has been pursuing changes in the mining sector. In 2013, the ministry revoked 31 mining licenses for minerals ranging from base and precious metals, industrial minerals, non-precious minerals and gemstones. As of 2015 the number rose to 65. The ministry claimed that the contracts were issued under unclear circumstances.

In the time between January and May 2013, out of all 500 mining licenses issued, only 20 were found credible. Revocation of the 65 licenses  by the Ministry of Mining in 2015 opened up 4.5 million acres of land to new explorers.

See also 

 Geography of Kenya
 Ministries of Kenya

References

External links 
 Ministry of Mining | Madini Kenya
 Ministry of Environment, Water and Natural Resources

Government agencies established in 2013
Government of Kenya
Government ministries of Kenya